Ignacio "Nacho" Méndez-Navia Fernández (born 30 March 1998) is a Spanish professional footballer who plays for Sporting de Gijón as a central midfielder.

Club career
Born in Luanco, Asturias, Méndez joined Sporting de Gijón's youth setup in 2010, from TSK Roces. He made his senior debut with the reserves on 21 August 2016, coming on as a second-half substitute and scoring his team's sixth in a 7–0 Tercera División home routing of UC Ceares.

On 26 April 2017, Méndez renewed his contract until 2019. After spending the whole 2017 pre-season with the first team, he made his professional debut on 27 August by starting in a 2–0 home win against CD Lugo in the Segunda División.

Méndez scored his first professional goal on 6 September 2017, netting the game's only in an away success over CF Reus Deportiu, in the season's Copa del Rey. On 22 December, he extended his contract until 2021, being definitely promoted to the main squad ahead of the following season.

Career statistics

References

External links

1998 births
Living people
People from Gozón
Spanish footballers
Footballers from Asturias
Association football midfielders
Segunda División players
Segunda División B players
Tercera División players
Sporting de Gijón B players
Sporting de Gijón players